The 1974–75 Chicago Black Hawks season was the Hawks' 49th season in the NHL, and the club was coming off a 41–14–23 record in 1973–74, earning 105 points, and finishing in second place in the West Division.  Then, the Black Hawks upset the heavily favored Boston Bruins in the NHL preliminary series before losing to the Buffalo Sabres in the NHL quarter-finals.

During the off-season, the NHL made a number of changes.  The league expanded by two more teams, as the Kansas City Scouts and Washington Capitals joined the league, making the NHL an 18 team league.  The schedule was then bumped up from 78 games to 80, and the previously two division league was split into two conferences and four divisions.  The Black Hawks found themselves in the newly created Smythe Division with the Minnesota North Stars, St. Louis Blues, Vancouver Canucks, and the expansion team Kansas City Scouts.  The Smythe Division was part of the newly created Campbell Conference.

Chicago began the regular season with a strong 7–3–1 in their first eleven games, however, the team fell into a slump, and found themselves under the .500 level 26 games into the season with a record of 11–12–3.  The Black Hawks would continue to hover around .500 for the rest of the season, and eventually finish the year with a 37–35–8 record, earning 82 points.  Chicago's 37 victories and 82 points were their lowest totals since the 1968–69 season, while their 35 losses was the most since the team lost 39 in 1957–58.  The team finished in third place in the Smythe Division, and earn a spot in the post-season as the eleventh seed.

Offensively, the Black Hawks were led by Stan Mikita, who led the club with 36 goals, 50 assists and 86 points.  Jim Pappin tied Mikita with 36 goals, and added 27 assists for 63 points.  Newly acquired Ivan Boldirev, who spent the previous season with the California Golden Seals, stepped in and finished second in team scoring with 67 points, as he recorded 23 goals and 44 assists.  Cliff Koroll had a strong season, scoring 27 goals and 59 points, while defenseman Dick Redmond led the blueline with 14 goals and 57 points.  John Marks led the Black Hawks with a +27 rating, while Phil Russell had a team high 260 penalty minutes.

In goal, Tony Esposito once again led the club with 34 victories and a 2.74 GAA, earning six shutouts in 71 games.

The Hawks opened the playoffs against the fifth seeded Boston Bruins in a best of three preliminary round.  The Bruins finished the season with a 40–26–14 record, earning 94 points, and a second-place finish in the Adams Division.  The series opened with a game at the Boston Garden, and the heavily favored Bruins easily disposed the Black Hawks by a score of 8–2.  The series moved to Chicago Stadium for the next game, and the Hawks responded, with a 4–3 overtime victory, to set up a third and final game back in Boston.  Chicago would complete the upset, stunning the Bruins by a score of 6–4 in the third game, to advance to the NHL quarter-finals.

Chicago's next opponent in a best of seven series was the second seeded Buffalo Sabres, who had a record of 49–16–15, earning 113 points, and a first-place finish in the Adams Division.  The series started with two games at the Buffalo Memorial Auditorium.  The Sabres used their home ice advantage, and quickly took a 2–0 series lead with wins of 4–1 and 3–1.  The series moved to Chicago for the next two games, and the Hawks cut into the Sabres lead with a 5–4 overtime win in the third game.  Buffalo responded in the fourth game though, as they cruised to a 6–2 win.  The Sabres closed out the series in the fifth game back in Buffalo, winning the game 3–1.

Season standings

Game log

Regular season

Chicago Black Hawks 2, Boston Bruins 1

Buffalo Sabres 4, Chicago Black Hawks 1

Season stats

Scoring leaders

Goaltending

Playoff stats

Scoring leaders

Goaltending

Draft picks
Chicago's draft picks at the 1974 NHL amateur draft held via conference call at the NHL office in Montreal, Quebec.

Awards, records and honors
Tommy Ivan, Lester Patrick Trophy

References

Sources
Hockey-Reference
Rauzulu's Street
Goalies Archive
HockeyDB
National Hockey League Guide & Record Book 2007

Chicago Blackhawks seasons
Chicago Blackhawks
Chicago Blackhawks